Fotografiska New York is a branch of the Swedish photography museum Fotografiska in Gramercy Park, Manhattan, New York City.  The museum's home is the Church Missions House, a six-story,  Renaissance Revival landmark.  It opened in December 2019.

In addition to galleries, the museum was home to Veronika, a restaurant operated by Stephen Starr. Open for a few months before it paused due to the coronavirus pandemic, Veronika at Fotografiska Museum, according to Time Out was a "high profile, gilded restaurant" that "never truly got going again." It permanently closed on September 1, 2021.

References

Museums established in 2019
Museums in Manhattan
Park Avenue
Gramercy Park